Iva Jurišić (born 24 March 1994) is a Croatian volleyball player. She is a member of the Croatia women's national volleyball team.

Career 
She was part of the Croatian national team at the 2015 FIVB World Grand Prix and at the 2016 FIVB World Grand Prix.

On the club level, she played for HAOK Mladost Zagreb.

References

External links 
  http://z.superliga.hr/?rubrika=igrac&id=161

1994 births
Living people
Croatian women's volleyball players
Place of birth missing (living people)